Saint Ninian's High School or St Ninian's High School may refer to:

St Ninian's High School, Douglas, Isle of Man
St Ninian's High School, Giffnock, East Renfrewshire, Scotland
St Ninian's High School, Kirkintilloch, East Dunbartonshire, Scotland